Hangin' Nothin' but Our Hands Down is the debut album by Portland-based indie rock band Nurses, self-released in 2006. It was re-released by Sargent House in 2007.

Critical reception
Pitchfork Media wrote that the album "comes with its own set of eccentricities to justify an otherwise grandiose, ambitious, Radiohead/Muse sound." The Chicago Tribune called it "an impressive opening shot, swinging from the ramshackle, back-porch country of 'Marching In Places' to 'And Now the Curse of Marjorie,' which layers on twitchy riffs and stuttered drums until it sounds like Chapman is performing in a futuristic construction zone."

Track listing 
"And Now the Curse of Marjorie" – 3:11
"Alone at Last" – 2:00
"Lots of Brass" – 3:36
"He Gots" – 2:22
"Hungry Mouth" – 3:05
"Wait for a Safe Sign" – 3:18
"Way Up High" – 2:07
"Act Now, You're King!" – 3:18
"Gettin' Angry" – 3:16
"It Came in a Flash" – 2:39
"Dem Leaves" – 4:05
"Marching in Places" – 3:04

Personnel
Aaron Chapman - vocals

References

2007 albums
Nurses (band) albums
Sargent House albums